George Hayes (June 21, 1914 – November 19, 1987) was a Canadian linesman in the National Hockey League.

Early life 
Hayes was born in Montreal, Quebec, Canada. He began officiating minor league hockey games before moving to the Ontario Hockey Association and American Hockey League.

Career 
Hayes started officiating in the NHL in 1946 and became the first official to work 1,000 games. He was also a part of a European tour with the New York Rangers and Boston Bruins in 1959. Hayes stopped officiating games in 1965 after refusing to take an eye exam mandated by then-NHL President Clarence Campbell.

During summers, Hayes scouted for the Cleveland Indians in Ontario. He was elected to the Hockey Hall of Fame in 1988 for his officiating.

References

External links
 

1914 births
1987 deaths
Hockey Hall of Fame inductees
Ice hockey people from Montreal
National Hockey League officials